This article describes the qualification for the 2021 Men's European Volleyball Championship.

Poland, Czech Republic, Estonia and Finland as host countries were directly qualified. The eight best placed teams at the 2019 edition also gained direct entries into the tournament.
26 teams had registered for participation but Denmark later withdrew due to restrictions in response to the COVID-19 pandemic. So, 25 teams competed for the remaining 12 places at the final tournament.

Qualified teams

Direct qualification
2019 Men's European Volleyball Championship final standing

Format
There being seven pools of either three or four teams each, the winners of each pool and the 5 best runners-up qualified for the 2021 European Championship. The pools were played in a double round-robin tournaments format officially from 30 August 2020 to 16 May 2021, according to the CEV web site. Since there was a different number of teams across the seven pools, the results of the matches played with the teams finishing last in the pools of four were discarded in order to determine the five best runners-up across all pools.

Pools composition
Teams were seeded following the serpentine system according to their CEV European Ranking as of 1 January 2020. But, Denmark withdrew after the draw. Rankings are shown in brackets.

Pool standing procedure
 Number of matches won
 Match points
 Sets ratio
 Points ratio
 If the tie continues as per the point ratio between two teams, the priority will be given to the team which won the last match between them. When the tie in points ratio is between three or more teams, a new classification of these teams in the terms of points 1, 2 and 3 will be made taking into consideration only the matches in which they were opposed to each other.

Match won 3–0 or 3–1: 3 match points for the winner, 0 match points for the loser
Match won 3–2: 2 match points for the winner, 1 match point for the loser

Results
The winners in each pool and the top five of the second ranked teams qualified for the 2021 European Championship.

Pool A
Dates: 7–16 May 2021
All times are Central European Summer Time (UTC+02:00).

|}

Tournament 1
Venue:  Krešimir Ćosić Hall, Zadar, Croatia

|}

Tournament 2
Venue:  Omnisport Apeldoorn Volleyball Hall, Apeldoorn, Netherlands

|}

Pool B
Venue:  Enerbox Sport Palace, Hadera, Israel
Dates: 12–17 January 2021
All times are Israel Standard Time (UTC+02:00).

|}

Tournament 1
|}

Tournament 2
|}

Pool C
Venue:  Boris Trajkovski Sports Center, Skopje, North Macedonia
Dates: 11–16 January 2021
All times are Central European Time (UTC+01:00).

|}

Tournament 1
|}

Tournament 2
|}

Pool D
Venue:  Eleftheria Indoor Hall, Nicosia, Cyprus
Dates: 30 August – 6 September 2020
All times are Eastern European Summer Time (UTC+03:00).

|}

Tournament 1
|}

Tournament 2
|}

Pool E
Dates: 6–16 May 2021

|}

Tournament 1
Venue:  Nitra City Hall, Nitra, Slovakia
All times are Central European Summer Time (UTC+02:00).

|}

Tournament 2
Venue:  Olimpia Sports Hall, Ploiești, Romania
All times are Eastern European Summer Time (UTC+03:00).

|}

Pool F
Dates: 7–16 May 2021

|}

Tournament 1
Venue:  Tbilisi New Volleyball Arena, Tbilisi, Georgia
All times are Georgia Time (UTC+04:00).

|}

Tournament 2
Venue:  SC Verde Hall, Podgorica, Montenegro
All times are Central European Summer Time (UTC+02:00).

|}

Pool G
Dates: 7–16 May 2021

|}

Tournament 1
Venue:  Ludovika Aréna, Budapest, Hungary
All times are Central European Summer Time (UTC+02:00).

|}

Tournament 2
Venue:  Centro de Desportos e Congressos de Matosinhos, Matosinhos, Portugal
All times are Western European Summer Time (UTC+01:00).

|}

Ranking of the second placed teams
Matches against the fourth placed team in each pool were not included in this ranking.
The top five of the second placed teams qualified for the 2021 European Championship.

|}

References

External links
Official website

Q
European Volleyball Championship
European Volleyball Championship
Qualification for volleyball competitions